Schaller-Crestland Community School District is a school district headquartered in Schaller, Iowa.

It is mostly within Sac County, with portions in Buena Vista and Ida counties. It serves the municipalities of Schaller, Early, and Nemaha.

As the district shares a superintendent and some schools with the Galva–Holstein Community School District, the two operate under the name "Ridge View Community School District".

History
The district formed on July 1, 1993, by the merger of the Schaller Community School District and the Crestland Community School District. 

Beiginning circa 1958, Crestland was the consolidated school districts of Early and Nemaha, Iowa respectively. They were known as the Cadets.  Schaller was an independent school district until 1993. They were known as the Rockets. 

As Schaller-Crestland, they were known as the Wildcats. During their time as Schaller-Crestland, some of their major sports rivals included Newell-Fonda, Sac City, and Galva–Holstein. 

Beginning circa 2010, it engaged in a grade-sharing agreement with the Galva–Holstein Community School District, and also shared superintendents with that district. They are now known as the Ridge View Raptors. 

Before grade sharing with Galva–Holstein, the district participated in sharing of sports programs with several neighboring districts including Aurelia Community School District and Galva–Holstein. During this time, they were known as the Buffalo Ridge Bison (sharing with Galva–Holstein), and the Stonecutters (exclusively in wrestling with Aurelia and Galva–Holstein, known as AGHSC).

Schools
, it operates Schaller Elementary School in Schaller and Ridge View Middle School in Early, while it grade-shares with Ridge View High School.

Previously it operated Schaller-Crestland Elementary and Middle School, and Schaller-Crestland High School in Early.

References
“Nemaha School System.” Black Walnut Tree Facts, Nemaha, Iowa., www.nemahaweb.com/nemahaia/education.htm.

External links
 Ridge View Raptors (joint site of Schaller-Crestland Community School District and Galva–Holstein Community School District)

School districts in Iowa
Education in Buena Vista County, Iowa
Education in Ida County, Iowa
Education in Sac County, Iowa
School districts established in 1993
1993 establishments in Iowa